Merab Kostava (May 26, 1939 – October 13, 1989) was a Georgian dissident, musician and poet; one of the leaders of the National-Liberation movement in Georgia. Along with Zviad Gamsakhurdia, he led the dissident movement in Georgia against the Soviet Union, until his death in a car accident in 1989.

Life
Kostava was born in 1939 in Tbilisi, of the Georgian Soviet Socialist Republic, USSR (the current capital of Georgia). In 1954, Kostava and Zviad Gamsakhurdia founded the Georgian youth underground organization "Gorgasliani," a tribute to Vakhtang Gorgasali, the medieval Georgian king who supposedly founded the capital, Tbilisi. Between 1956 and 1958 Kostava, together with Gamsakhurdia and several other members of this organization were jailed by the KGB for "anti-Soviet activity." The charges against Kostava and Gamsakhurdia included the dissemination of anti-communist literature and proclamations.

Kostava graduated from the Tbilisi State Conservatoire in 1962. From 1962–1977 he was a teacher at a local music school in Tbilisi.

In 1973, Kostava and Gamsakhurdia established the Initiative Group for defence of Human Rights. In 1976 Kostava co-founded the Georgian Helsinki Group (later renamed the Georgian Helsinki Union in 1989). From 1976–1977 and 1987–1989 Kostava was a member of the Governing Board of the abovementioned human rights organization. After 1975 Kostava was a member of Amnesty International.

In 1977, Kostava and Gamsakhurdia were arrested and jailed, charged with spreading anti-Soviet propaganda, the result of bringing note to the pillaging of church artifacts and the deportation of subsequent treatment of the Meskhetian Turks. Kostava was sent to Siberia to serve his sentence. While Gamsakhurdia publicly renounced his views in hopes of a lesser sentence, Kostava refused to do so. He was released from prison in August, 1987. In 1978, the two men were nominated to the Nobel Peace Prize by the Congress of the USA. In 1988 Kostava co-founded the Society of Saint Ilia the Righteous and was one of the leaders of this political pro-independence organization. From 1988–1989 he was one of the organizers and active participants of most (if not all) peaceful pro-independence political actions within the Georgian SSR. On April 9, 1989 Kostava was jailed again but was released after 45 days.

Merab Kostava was active in the underground network of Samizdat publishers, co-publisher of the Georgian underground periodical "Okros Satsmisi" ("The Golden Fleece"). He was the author of many important literary and scientific works.

Death
On October 13, 1989, Merab Kostava died in a car accident near Boriti under suspicious circumstances. In 2013, he was posthumously awarded the title and Order of National Hero of Georgia.

Remembrance
There are streets named after Merab Kostava in Tbilisi, Batumi, Rustavi and Shindisi.

References

1939 births
1989 deaths
Burials at Mtatsminda Pantheon
Musicians from Tbilisi
Mingrelians
Politicians from Tbilisi
Male poets from Georgia (country)
Soviet dissidents
Nationalists from Georgia (country)
Dissidents from Georgia (country)
Georgian Soviet Socialist Republic
Prisoners and detainees from Georgia (country)
Prisoners and detainees of the Soviet Union
Road incident deaths in the Soviet Union
Road incident deaths in Georgia (country)
20th-century poets from Georgia (country)
National Heroes of Georgia